or  is a lake located in the municipality of Sørfold in Nordland county, Norway.  The  lake is located on the east side of the village of Mørsvikbotn.

See also
 List of lakes in Norway
 Geography of Norway

References

Sørfold
Lakes of Nordland